Bondevik's Second Cabinet governed Norway between 19 October 2001 and 17 October 2005. It was led by Kjell Magne Bondevik and consisted of the Conservative Party, the Christian Democratic Party and the Liberal Party. It had the following composition:

Cabinet members

|}

State Secretaries

References
Kjell Magne Bondeviks andre regjering 2001–2005 – Regjeringen.no

Bondevik 2
Bondevik 2
Bondevik 2
Bondevik 2
2001 establishments in Norway
2005 disestablishments in Norway
Cabinets established in 2001
Cabinets disestablished in 2005